Lieutenant-Colonel Thomas Herbert Elliot Jackson (12 January 1903 – 22 May 1968) was an English coffee farmer in Kenya.  He served as an officer in the British Army during the Second World War, seeing service with the King's African Rifles and as a military administrator in British Somaliland.  Jackson served in the Kenyan colonial administration during the Mau Mau Rebellion.

Jackson was also a keen entomologist best known for his studies of African butterflies. He amassed the largest collection of native butterflies in Africa, that was donated to museums across the world.  Jackson was murdered at his farm at Kitale in 1968.

Early life 
Jackson was born in Dorset, England, on 12 January 1903, the son of Brigadier-General Herbert Kendall Jackson.  He was educated at Wellington College and his father intended for Jackson to follow him into the army.  Jackson instead chose a different career and attended Harper Adams Agricultural College, Shropshire.  He visited Kenya briefly in 1923 before moving to British India to work on an indigo plantation owned by an uncle.

Jackson returned to Kenya in 1924 and settled there, learning how to grow coffee on a farm owned by Maxwell Trench near Nyeri.  Jackson established his own farm, Kapretwa, on the lower slopes of Mount Elgon and was joined by his father and other family members.  Jackson's farm was the first in the area to attempt to grow coffee but it quickly became one of the most productive in the Mount Elgon District.

Second World War 
After the outbreak of war Jackson joined an officer cadet training unit and was drafted into the 4th battalion of the King's African Rifles.  After a while he was seconded to the government of Turkana district, where he raised the Turkana Irregulars as a defence force against Italian invasion from occupied Ethiopia.  Following Operation Appearance, which liberated British Somaliland from Italian occupation, Jackson was assigned to the military administration of a large part of the north of the protectorate.  By the end of the war he had reached the rank of lieutenant-colonel.

Later career 
Jackson returned to his farm after the war and continue to develop it, including a large garden featuring rare orchids.  During the Mau Mau rebellion he volunteered for service and held a senior role in Embu district.  After the rebellion was quelled he returned to his farm.  He was stabbed to death at his home in Kitale by a gang on the night of 22 May 1968.  The murder was the second in the White Highlands in a week and a dusk-to-dawn curfew was imposed as a result.

Entomology 
Jackson had been a keen naturalist since his youth and though he later focussed on entomology was also an ornithologist and botanist.  In 1935 he participated in the British Museum expedition to the Rwenzori Mountains with the dipterist Frederick Wallace Edwards and the botanist George Taylor.  The expedition contributed large numbers of moths, butterflies and beetles to the museum collection.  Shortly after this expedition Jackson began his own collection of butterflies and writing academic papers on his finds.  His favourite families were the Nymphalidae and the Lycaenidae.

In Kenya Jackson amassed one of the world's finest collections of African butterflies, collected in his spare time and on expeditions across Africa.  It was the largest collection of native butterflies in Africa. Jackson developed new techniques of capturing and breeding the insects and trained black staff who collected specimens for him in Kenya, Uganda, Tanzania, Middle Congo, Cameroun, Nigeria and the Ivory Coast. At the time of his death he was negotiating with the government of Gabon to send his collectors there.

He collected hundreds of new species.  He wrote a number of journal articles on many of his discoveries but his publications were relatively little, compared to his collection.  He began writing only at the age of 34 and there were long intervals between his early papers.  His output increased in the late 1950s.  His most important works are perhaps his early 1960s works on the Epitola and his collaboration with Victor Van Someren on mimicry in African butterflies.

In 1961 Jackson sent around half of his collection, some 65,000 specimens to the British Museum, feeling it would benefit from being more readily available to the scientific community.  He often visited the museum to study its collection and compare them to new species he had collected.  Through the museum Jackson began a long professional association with French entomologist Henri Stempffer.  As well as the donation to the British Museum Jackson donated thousands of specimens to other collections including those of the National Museum of Natural History, France, the Belgian Royal Museum for Central Africa and Stempffer's private collection.

On his death the remainder of his entomological collection, around 65,000 specimens, as well as his library, was left to the Kenyan National Museum at Nairobi.

Works
As per :

References

Bibliography 

English lepidopterists
1968 deaths
1903 births
20th-century British zoologists
Alumni of Harper Adams University
British Kenya people
Kenyan farmers
Kenyan murder victims
Military personnel from Dorset
People educated at Wellington College, Berkshire